Church of the Holy Trinity is a Roman Catholic church in Gierviaty, Grodno Region, in Belarus. It is an example of the Belarusian Neogothic architecture and was built in 1899–1903. The church is a site of cultural heritage of Belarus.

History 

The first parish in Gierviaty was established in 1526 by the archbishop John. Gradually it fell into decline and in 1621 Eustachy Wołłowicz constructed the new wooden church. It was destroyed by fire in 1736. Almost a hundred years later the philanthropist reconstructed the church. In 1860 Kazimir Domeyko founded the stone bell tower and reconstructed the church in 1862. The last restoration was executed in 1894-1895, but three years later the church was demolished.

Modern building was constructed in place of the old one in 1899—1903. Usually the authorship is attributed to architects  and Alaksiej Połazaŭ (1820-1903). However, some sources claim that the design was created by Ignatiy Olshansky, brother of a local priest. According to the year books, every day 70 men worked at the construction site. Specially for the church a brick factory was built near the village. Roof tiles were imported from Germany. Mostly the funds for construction were donated by Vazlav Domeyko and his mother Anjela, nee . Her son-in-law brought from Germany the ceramic tiles to the church.

The new church was consecrated on September 8, 1904.

Architecture 
The Church of the Holy Trinity is a typical example of the Neogothic style. Its height is 61 meter, and it's one of the tallest churches in Belarus. The temple has three naves and a small transept, the naves are separated from each other by two rows of five columns each. There is no apse behind the presbytery. A characteristic element of the architecture of the temple are multi-stage buttresses, turning into flying buttresses. The walls of the temple are cut through with narrow lancet window openings in niches.

In front of the temple there are several wooden crosses with rich carvings, which is typical for Lithuanian temples. Around the temple there is a landscape park with rare plants and figures of the apostles. The church is acknowledged as one of the most beautiful in Belarus, nicknamed ‘Little Switzerland’ and ‘Belarusian Notre-Dame. The church is the main tourist attraction in Gierviaty.

Plan of the church

References

Further reading 
 А. М. Кулагін. Каталіцкія храмы Беларусі. — Мінск: 2008. 
 «Гервяты, костел Троицкий» //«Архітэктура Беларусі. Энцыклапедычны даведнік». Мінск, «Беларуская Энцыклапедыя імя Петруся Броўкі», 1993 год.

External links 

 Church interior on Google Street View

Roman Catholic churches in Belarus
Churches in Belarus
Landmarks in Belarus
Buildings and structures in Grodno Region
Brick Gothic
Gothic Revival church buildings in Belarus